The 1982 N-Rich Coffee Creamers season was the eighth season of the franchise in the Philippine Basketball Association (PBA). Known as Great Taste Coffee Makers in the Reinforced Filipino Conference.

Transactions

Summary
Great Taste manage to win only two of their 18 games in the elimination phase of the Reinforced All-Filipino Conference, both in the first round against Mariwasa-Honda and Toyota.  After back-to-back victories, the Coffee Makers lost all of their final 13 outings with import Perry Davis sitting out in their last five games because of an injury.

From a sour campaign of a last place finish, the erstwhile Great Taste Coffee Makers, now known as N-Rich for the Open Conference, come out strong in the last tournament of the season with Danny Salisbury and Rich Adams as their imports. N-Rich had an eye-popping start of a six-game sweep in Phase 1 of their 18-game schedule in the eliminations. The Coffee Creamers were tied with Gilbey’s Gin on top of the standings with 13 wins and five losses for an outright semifinals berth. Going into the last two playdates of the semifinals, N-Rich was a win away from their first-ever trip to the finals, but they lost to Gilbey’s and were forced into a playoff by Toyota Super Corollas. The Coffee Creamers blew their opportunity three times as they lost to the Super Corollas in the knockout game for the right to play Gilbey’s Gin in the final playoffs.

Won-loss records vs Opponents

Reinforced All-Filipino Conference roster

Open Conference roster

References

Great Taste Coffee Makers seasons
N-Rich